James Robert Otto (August 23, 1919 – November 7, 1993) was an American football and basketball coach and college athletics administrator. He served as the head football coach at Buena Vista College—now known as Buena Vista University—in Storm Lake, Iowa from 1948 to 1952 and Mankato State College—now known as the Minnesota State University, Mankato—from 1953 to 1969.

A native of Fort Dodge, Iowa, Otto played college football at the University of Iowa as a tackle from 1939 to 1941. Otto died from lung cancer, on November 7, 1993, at his home in Mankato, Minnesota.

Head coaching record

Football

References

External links
 Minnesota State Hall of Fame profile
 

1919 births
1993 deaths
American football tackles
Buena Vista Beavers athletic directors
Buena Vista Beavers football coaches
Iowa Hawkeyes football coaches
Iowa Hawkeyes football players
Minnesota State Mavericks athletic directors
Minnesota State Mavericks football coaches
Minnesota State Mavericks men's basketball coaches
United States Army Air Forces officers
United States Army Air Forces personnel of World War II
Sportspeople from Fort Dodge, Iowa
Coaches of American football from Iowa
Players of American football from Iowa
Basketball coaches from Iowa
Deaths from cancer in Minnesota
Deaths from lung cancer
Military personnel from Iowa